Isle St. George is an unincorporated community in Put-in-Bay Township, Ottawa County, Ohio, United States.  It is the only community on North Bass Island in Lake Erie.  The North Bass Island Post Office was established on May 25, 1864, and the name changed to Isle Saint George Post Office on March 2, 1874. The Isle Saint George ZIP code 43436 provides PO Box service.

See also 
 Isle St. George AVA

References 

Unincorporated communities in Ottawa County, Ohio
Unincorporated communities in Ohio